Alkimos railway station is a proposed station on the Joondalup Line in Perth, Western Australia that is being delivered as part of the Metronet Yanchep rail extension project.

The station will include a bus interchange with eight weather-protected stands, and approximately 600 parking bays. The station will also include 10 bicycle parking u-rails, two bike shelters with the ability to add two more, and a dedicated passenger drop-off area.

The station will be situated near the intersection of Marmion Avenue and Romeo Road and will be accessed off a purpose-built street, as part of the DevelopmentWA Alkimos Central development. Approximately 3,616 daily boardings are predicted at Alkimos railway station in 2031.

At the 2021–22 State Budget, it was announced that the Yanchep rail extension had been deferred by 12 months, as a result of Western Australia's skills shortage. This was alongside the deferment of 15 other state government infrastructure projects.

References

External links
 Yanchep Rail Extension website page for Alkimos, Eglinton and Yanchep stations

Proposed railway stations in Perth, Western Australia